Bhankharpur is a census town in Mohali district (officially Sahibzada Ajit Singh Nagar district) in the state of Punjab, India.

Demographics
 India census, Bhankharpur had a population of 9118. Males constitute 54% of the population and females 46%. Bhankharpur has an average literacy rate of 71%, higher than the national average of 59.5%; with male literacy of 74% and female literacy of 67%. 13% of the population is under 6 years of age.

References

Cities and towns in Sahibzada Ajit Singh Nagar district